Kepler-283c is an exoplanet orbiting the K-type star Kepler-283 every 93 days in the circumstellar habitable zone, discovered by the Kepler space telescope in 2014.

Characteristics

Mass, radius and temperature 
Its radius is 1.82 . Its orbit is circular with an eccentricity of 0.

Host star 
The planet orbits a late orange dwarf star called Kepler-283, spectral type K7V, about 1,596 light years from Earth in the constellation of Cygnus.

Orbit 
The planet orbits its star every 93 days, at a distance of around 0.336 AU

References

283c
Exoplanets discovered in 2014
Transiting exoplanets
Super-Earths in the habitable zone
Exoplanets in the habitable zone
Super-Earths

Cygnus (constellation)